Shemai is a traditional dessert item in Bangladesh and West Bengal, India. It is a popular item during Eid. While popular in Eid it is consumed throughout the year. Shemai is sweet dessert form of Vermicelli.

Ingredients
The staple ingredients of shemai are milk, ghee, sugar, roasted vermicelli, and various assortments of nuts and spices. Shemai variations include a kheer version, dry fruits, and jodda shemai.

History

Shemai originated from Bengal. Ice Today described shemai as a distant cousin of Sheer khurma, an Afghani dessert. Some recipes used powdered milk and/or condense milk. 

There has been some questions over the hygiene of factories producing shemai. In June 2016, substandard shemai, produced in unauthorized factories, flooded the market in Saidpur, Bangladesh. Next year there was widespread adultered shemai in Chittagong. Sales of packaged shemai fell during the COVID-19 pandemic in Bangladesh. The prices also rose as many of the factories stopped production due to the pandemic.

References

Bengali cuisine
Bangladeshi desserts
Indian desserts